William Iredell Turner (June 7, 1812 – October 28, 1881), also occasionally and erroneously referred to as William J. Turner, was a Florida pioneer and a soldier who helped establish Bradenton, Florida and Parrish, Florida.

Turner was born in Virginia on June 7, 1812. When he was about sixteen years old, he enlisted in the military. He fought during the Second Seminole War, during which time he was injured in the neck. He was discharged from the military in August 1837 but returned to the military to fight during the American Civil War, where he served as a Colonel for the Florida State Militia and commanded Fort Brooke in 1861. Prior to the Civil War Turner owned and ran Oak Hill, the largest plantation in Alachua County, Florida.

Turner was a proponent of secession and had unsuccessfully run for a seat in the Florida House of Representatives. However, he is known to have been elected to the Florida Senate in 1865.

Turner died on October 28, 1881, and is buried alongside his wife Isabella at the Parrish Cemetery.

Referenced

External links

1812 births
1881 deaths
American planters